UEPA! Un escenario para amar, is a Mexican telenovela produced by Azteca in 2014–15. It is a remake of telenovela Como en el cine produced in 2001.

Synopsis 
UEPA! Un escenario para amar portrays a young woman who must live a double life to be able to take care of her younger sister.

Cast 
Gloria Stalina as Lourdes "Lule" Jordán
Erick Chapa as Claudio / Franco
Betty Monroe as Zoila Lezama
Martha Mariana Castro as Martha Mariana Castro
Thali García as July Rivero
Ana Belena as Alexandra Williams
Regina Payes as Anya Padrón
Lourdes Narro as Rada
Carmen Baqué as Dolores
Nubia Martí as Luna
Humberto Bua as Jorge
Christian Vázquez as Moisés "Moy" Lezama
Ramiro Fumazoni as Padre de Claudio
Anette Michel as Madre de Lourdes
Martín Altomaro as Poncho
Jessica Roteache as Teresita
Cecilia Constantino as Hermana Fausta
Lourdes Narro as Rada
Patrick Fernández as Omar
Marcela Alcaraz as Carolina
Alexa Martin as Marisel de los Arcos
Marco Aurelio Nava as Greco
Andy Chavez de Moore as Angélica
Elsa Ortíz as Tamara
Gerardo Acuña as Sergio Williams
Ariana Ron as Bianca "La Pantera" Campestre
Gala Montes as Young Lourdes "Lule" Jordán 
Tatiana del Real as Estefani Jordán
Guillermo Iván as Aldo 
Patrick Fernández as Omar
Valeria Galaviz as Rox
Cristóbal Orellana as Saúl Torres
Camila Rojas as Gabriela "Gaby" Ruíz

Soundtrack

References

External links 

2015 telenovelas
Mexican telenovelas
TV Azteca telenovelas
2015 Mexican television series debuts
2015 Mexican television series endings
Spanish-language telenovelas